There was formerly a town of Shenandoah in Oneida County, New York.

Shenandoah is a community in East Fishkill, Dutchess County, New York.  It is near Interstate 84, the Taconic State Parkway, and the Appalachian Trail.

The former Shenandoah Service Area on the Taconic Parkway is named for this community.

References

Hamlets in Dutchess County, New York
Poughkeepsie–Newburgh–Middletown metropolitan area